Ramon van Haaren (born 16 September 1972) is a Dutch former footballer. In his 14-year lasting career, he played for RKC Waalwijk, Roda JC, Feyenoord and Sparta Rotterdam.

Van Haaren was a defender who was born in Waalwijk and made his debut in professional football, being part of the RKC Waalwijk squad in the 1993-94 season. He ended his career in 2007, during his second stint at RKC.

Honours
Roda JC
KNVB Cup: 1996–97, 1999–2000

References

1972 births
Living people
Dutch footballers
Eredivisie players
Eerste Divisie players
RKC Waalwijk players
Roda JC Kerkrade players
Feyenoord players
Sparta Rotterdam players
People from Waalwijk
Association football defenders
Footballers from North Brabant